Thomas Simpson (1710–1761) was a British mathematician and inventor.

Thomas, Tom, or Tommy Simpson may also refer to:

Sports
 Tom Simpson (footballer) (1879–1950), English footballer for Port Vale and Bury
 Duke Simpson (1927–2021), real name Thomas Leo Simpson, American baseball pitcher and member of 1953 Chicago Cubs
 Tommy Simpson (footballer, born 1904) (1904–after 1928), Scottish football outside right active in the 1920s
 Tommy Simpson (footballer, born 1931) (1931–2015), Scottish football defender active in the 1950s
 Thomas Simpson (cricketer) (1879–1961), English cricketer
 Thomas Simpson (footballer) (1933–2016), Australian footballer
 Tom Simpson (1937–1967), English road racing cyclist of the 1960s
 Tom Simpson (ice hockey) (born 1952), Canadian ice hockey player
 Tom Simpson (golfer) (1879–1???), English professional golfer
 Tom Simpson (cricketer) (born 1974), English cricketer

Arts and entertainment
 Thomas Simpson (composer) (1582–c. 1628), English composer
 Thomas Simpson (actor), English stage actor of the late seventeenth and early eighteenth century
 Tom Simpson, producer and editor of My Family Online
 Tom Simpson (musician) (born 1972), Scottish musician, keyboard player for the band Snow Patrol

Other
 Thomas Simpson (architect of Nottingham) (1816–1880), architect of Nottingham
 Thomas Simpson (architect) (1825–1908), architect to the Brighton School Board
 Thomas Simpson (engineer) (1755–1823), British civil engineer
 Thomas Simpson (explorer) (1808–1840), explorer with the Hudson's Bay Company
 Thomas Blantyre Simpson (1892–1954), Scottish lawyer
 Thomas C. Simpson, American businessman, jurist, and politician from Massachusetts
 Thomas Edward Simpson (1873–1951), Canadian politician
 Thomas Joseph Simpson (1921–2017), Canadian recipient of the Distinguished Service Medal
 Thomas W. Simpson (born 1975), scholar, teacher, and writer in the fields of religion, human rights, and social justice

See also
 Thomas Simpson Cooke (1782–1848), Irish composer